Portland Road is a town in the Shire of Cook, Queensland, Australia. The town is within the locality of Lockhart River.

History 
The town takes its name from the Portland Road harbour. The harbour, in turn, is named after William Henry Cavendish, Duke of Portland. The name first appears on an 1897 chart published by the British Admiralty.

References

Shire of Cook
Towns in Queensland